The men's tournament in the 2018 Rugby World Cup Sevens was held at AT&T Park in San Francisco. New Zealand won the tournament and took home the Melrose Cup by defeating England 33–12 in the final; South Africa won the bronze by defeating Fiji 24–19. The tournament was dominated by the World Series core teams, which accounted for all eight of the teams that reached the quarterfinals. Ireland was the highest placed non core team in ninth, notching wins against core teams Kenya, Wales, and Australia.

The top point scorer was Papua New Guinea's Emmanuel Guise with 37 points. The joint top try scorers were New Zealand's Joe Ravouvou and South Africa's Siviwe Soyizwapi with 6 each.

Format
Unlike previous editions, the tournament will be played for the first time in a knock-out only format.

 Teams in the Championship Cup will compete for the Melrose Cup and bronze medals.
 Losing teams in the Championship Cup Quarter-finals will compete for 5th Place. 
 Losing teams in the Championship Cup Round of 16 (second round) will compete for the Challenge Trophy. 
 Losing teams in the Championship Cup Pre-round of 16 (first round) will compete for the Bowl.
 Losing teams in the Challenge Trophy Quarter-finals will compete for 13th Place.
 Losing teams in the Bowl Quarter-finals will compete for 21st Place.
 Teams entering in the Pre-round of 16 (first round) in the Championship Cup will play a minimum of four matches and a maximum of five matches.
 Teams entering in the Round of 16 (second round) in the Championship Cup will play four matches.

Teams

Squads

Draw
The twenty-four teams are seeded as follows:
 The fourteen core teams of the 2017–18 World Rugby Sevens Series who qualified are ranked as the first fourteen teams. These teams are seeded according to combined rankings derived from the 2016–17 World Rugby Sevens Series, and the first seven rounds of the 2017–18 World Rugby Sevens Series.
 Places 15–24 are allocated to teams that qualified by way of the regional tournaments. These teams are seeded based on their rankings from the 2018 Hong Kong Sevens qualifier.
Teams ranked 1-8 receive byes and enter the Championship Cup in the Round of 16 (second round).
Teams ranked 9-24 enter the Championship Cup in the Pre-round of 16 (first round).

Match officials
World Rugby announced a panel of ten match officials for the men's tournament.

 Rasta Rasivhenge (South Africa)
 Richard Kelly (New Zealand)
 Craig Evans (Wales)
 Sam Grove-White (Scotland)
 Damon Murphy (Australia)

 Jérémy Rozier (France)
 Matt Rodden (Hong Kong)
 Richard Haughton (England)
 Damián Schneider (Argentina)
 Mike O'Brien (United States)

Tournament

Championship Cup Qualifying Round

21st Place

Bowl

13th Place

Challenge Trophy

5th Place

Championship Cup

Tournament placings

Attendance
Over 100,000 fans attended the three day event, which was a Rugby World Cup Sevens record until the 2022 tournament.

Player scoring

Source: World Rugby

See also
 2018 Rugby World Cup Sevens – Women's tournament

References

Men